An antiquarian or antiquary is an aficionado or student of antiquities or things of the past. More specifically, the term is used for those who study history with particular attention to ancient artifacts, archaeological and historic sites, or historic archives and manuscripts. The essence of antiquarianism is a focus on the empirical evidence of the past, and is perhaps best encapsulated in the motto adopted by the 18th-century antiquary Sir Richard Colt Hoare, "We speak from facts, not theory."

The Oxford English Dictionary first cites "archaeologist" from 1824; this soon took over as the usual term for one major branch of antiquarian activity. "Archaeology", from 1607 onwards, initially meant what is now seen as "ancient history" generally, with the narrower modern sense first seen in 1837.

Today the term "antiquarian" is often used in a pejorative sense, to refer to an excessively narrow focus on factual historical trivia, to the exclusion of a sense of historical context or process. Few today would describe themselves as "antiquaries", but some institutions such as the Society of Antiquaries of London (founded in 1707) retain their historic names. The term "antiquarian bookseller" remains current for dealers in more expensive old books.

History

Antiquarianism in ancient China

During the Song dynasty (960–1279), the scholar Ouyang Xiu (1007–1072) analyzed alleged ancient artifacts bearing archaic inscriptions in bronze and stone, which he preserved in a collection of some 400 rubbings. Patricia Ebrey writes that Ouyang pioneered early ideas in epigraphy.

The  or "Illustrated Catalogue of Examined Antiquity" (preface dated 1092) compiled by Lü Dalin (1046–1092) is one of the oldest known catalogues to systematically describe and classify ancient artifacts which were unearthed.

Interests in antiquarian studies of ancient inscriptions and artifacts waned after the Song dynasty, but were revived by early Qing dynasty (1644–1912) scholars such as Gu Yanwu (1613–1682) and Yan Ruoju (1636–1704).

Antiquarianism in ancient Rome
In ancient Rome, a strong sense of traditionalism motivated an interest in studying and recording the "monuments" of the past; the Augustan historian Livy uses the Latin  in the sense of "antiquarian matters." Books on antiquarian topics covered such subjects as the origin of customs, religious rituals, and political institutions; genealogy; topography and landmarks; and etymology. Annals and histories might also include sections pertaining to these subjects, but annals are chronological in structure, and Roman histories, such as those of Livy and Tacitus, are both chronological and offer an overarching narrative and interpretation of events. By contrast, antiquarian works as a literary form are organized by topic, and any narrative is short and illustrative, in the form of anecdotes.

Major antiquarian Latin writers with surviving works include Varro, Pliny the Elder, Aulus Gellius, and Macrobius. The Roman emperor Claudius published antiquarian works, none of which is extant. Some of Cicero's treatises, particularly his work on divination, show strong antiquarian interests, but their primary purpose is the exploration of philosophical questions. Roman-era Greek writers also dealt with antiquarian material, such as Plutarch in his Roman Questions and the Deipnosophistae of Athenaeus. The aim of Latin antiquarian works is to collect a great number of possible explanations, with less emphasis on arriving at a truth than in compiling the evidence. The antiquarians are often used as sources by the ancient historians, and many antiquarian writers are known only through these citations.

Medieval and early modern antiquarianism

Despite the importance of antiquarian writing in the literature of ancient Rome, some scholars view antiquarianism as emerging only in the Middle Ages. Medieval antiquarians sometimes made collections of inscriptions or records of monuments, but the Varro-inspired concept of  among the Romans as the "systematic collections of all the relics of the past" faded. Antiquarianism's wider flowering is more generally associated with the Renaissance, and with the critical assessment and questioning of classical texts undertaken in that period by humanist scholars. Textual criticism soon broadened into an awareness of the supplementary perspectives on the past which could be offered by the study of coins, inscriptions and other archaeological remains, as well as documents from medieval periods.  Antiquaries often formed collections of these and other objects; cabinet of curiosities is a general term for early collections, which often encompassed antiquities and more recent art, items of natural history, memorabilia and items from far-away lands.

The importance placed on lineage in early modern Europe meant that antiquarianism was often closely associated with genealogy, and a number of prominent antiquaries (including Robert Glover, William Camden, William Dugdale and Elias Ashmole) held office as professional heralds. The development of genealogy as a "scientific" discipline (i.e. one that rejected unsubstantiated legends, and demanded high standards of proof for its claims) went hand-in-hand with the development of antiquarianism. Genealogical antiquaries recognised the evidential value for their researches of non-textual sources, including seals and church monuments.

Many early modern antiquaries were also chorographers: that is to say, they recorded landscapes and monuments within regional or national descriptions. In England, some of the most important of these took the form of county histories.

In the context of the 17th-century scientific revolution, and more specifically that of the  "Quarrel of the Ancients and the Moderns" in England and France, the antiquaries were firmly on the side of the "Moderns". They increasingly argued that empirical primary evidence could be used to refine and challenge the received interpretations of history handed down from literary authorities.

19th–21st centuries

By the end of the 19th century, antiquarianism had diverged into a number of more specialized academic disciplines including archaeology, art history, numismatics, sigillography, philology, literary studies and diplomatics. Antiquaries had always attracted a degree of ridicule (see below), and since the mid-19th century the term has tended to be used most commonly in negative or derogatory contexts. Nevertheless, many practising antiquaries continue to claim the title with pride. In recent years, in a scholarly environment in which interdisciplinarity is increasingly encouraged, many of the established antiquarian societies (see below) have found new roles as facilitators for collaboration between specialists.

Terminological distinctions

Antiquaries and antiquarians
"Antiquary" was the usual term in English from the 16th to the mid-18th centuries to describe a person interested in antiquities (the word "antiquarian" being generally found only in an adjectival sense). From the second half of the 18th century, however, "antiquarian" began to be used more widely as a noun, and today both forms are equally acceptable.

Antiquaries and historians
From the 16th to the 19th centuries, a clear distinction was perceived to exist between the interests and activities of the antiquary and the historian. The antiquary was concerned with the relics of the past (whether documents, artefacts or monuments), whereas the historian was concerned with the narrative of the past, and its political or moral lessons for the present. The skills of the antiquary tended to be those of the critical examination and interrogation of his sources, whereas those of the historian were those of the philosophical and literary reinterpretation of received narratives. Francis Bacon in 1605 described readings of the past based on antiquities (which he defined as "Monuments, Names, Wordes, Proverbes, Traditions, Private Recordes, and Evidences, Fragments of stories, Passages of Bookes, that concerne not storie, and the like") as "unperfect Histories". Such distinctions began to be eroded in the second half of the 19th century as the school of empirical source-based history championed by Leopold von Ranke began to find widespread acceptance, and today's historians employ the full range of techniques pioneered by the early antiquaries. Rosemary Sweet suggests that 18th-century antiquaries

Antiquarians, antiquarian books and antiques
In many European languages, the word antiquarian (or its equivalent) has shifted in modern times to refer to a person who either trades in or collects rare and ancient antiquarian books; or who trades in or collects antique objects more generally. In English, however, although the terms "antiquarian book" and "antiquarian bookseller" are widely used, the nouns "antiquarian" and "antiquary" very rarely carry this sense. An antiquarian is primarily a student of ancient books, documents, artefacts or monuments. Many antiquarians have also built up extensive personal collections in order to inform their studies, but a far greater number have not; and conversely many collectors of books or antiques would not regard themselves (or be regarded) as antiquarians.

Pejorative associations

Antiquaries often appeared to possess an unwholesome interest in death, decay, and the unfashionable, while their focus on obscure and arcane details meant that they seemed to lack an awareness both of the realities and practicalities of modern life, and of the wider currents of history. For all these reasons they frequently became objects of ridicule.

The antiquary was satirised in John Earle's Micro-cosmographie of 1628 ("Hee is one that hath that unnaturall disease to bee enamour'd of old age, and wrinkles, and loves all things (as Dutchmen doe Cheese) the better for being mouldy and worme-eaten"), in Jean-Siméon Chardin's painting Le Singe Antiquaire (c. 1726), in Sir Walter Scott's novel The Antiquary (1816), in the caricatures of Thomas Rowlandson, and in many other places. The New Dictionary of the Terms Ancient and Modern of the Canting Crew of c. 1698 defines an antiquary as "A curious critic in old Coins, Stones and Inscriptions, in Worm-eaten Records and ancient Manuscripts, also one that affects and blindly dotes, on Relics, Ruins, old Customs Phrases and Fashions". In his "Epigrams", John Donne wrote of The Antiquary: "If in his study he hath so much care To hang all old strange things Let his wife beware." The word's resonances were close to those of modern terms for individuals with obsessive interests in technical minutiae, such as nerd, trainspotter or anorak.

The connoisseur Horace Walpole, who shared many of the antiquaries' interests, was nonetheless emphatic in his insistence that the study of cultural relics should be selective and informed by taste and aesthetics. He deplored the more comprehensive and eclectic approach of the Society of Antiquaries, and their interest in the primitive past. In 1778 he wrote:

In his essay "On the Uses and Abuses of History for Life" from his Untimely Meditations, philosopher Friedrich Nietzsche examines three forms of history. One of these is "antiquarian history", an objectivising historicism which forges little or no creative connection between past and present. Nietzsche's philosophy of history had a significant impact on critical history in the 20th century.

C. R. Cheney, writing in 1956, observed that "[a]t the present day we have reached such a pass that the word 'antiquary' is not always held in high esteem, while 'antiquarianism' is almost a term of abuse". Arnaldo Momigliano in 1990 defined an antiquarian as "the type of man who is interested in historical facts without being interested in history". Professional historians still often use the term "antiquarian" in a pejorative sense, to refer to historical studies which seem concerned only to place on record trivial or inconsequential facts, and which fail to consider the wider implications of these, or to formulate any kind of argument. The term is also sometimes applied to the activities of amateur historians such as historical reenactors, who may have a meticulous approach to reconstructing the costumes or material culture of past eras, but who are perceived to lack much understanding of the cultural values and historical contexts of the periods in question.

Antiquarian societies

London societies
Members included William Camden, Sir Robert Cotton, John Stow, William Lambarde, Richard Carew and others. This body existed until 1604, when it fell under suspicion of being political in its aims, and was abolished by King James I. Papers read at their meetings are preserved in Cotton's collections, and were printed by Thomas Hearne in 1720 under the title A Collection of Curious Discourses, a second edition appearing in 1771.

In 1707 a number of English antiquaries began to hold regular meetings for the discussion of their hobby and in 1717 the Society of Antiquaries was formally reconstituted, finally receiving a charter from King George II in 1751. In 1780 King George III granted the society apartments in Somerset House, and in 1874 it moved into its present accommodation in Burlington House, Piccadilly. The society was governed by a council of twenty and a president who is ex officio a trustee of the British Museum.

Other notable societies
The Society of Antiquaries of Scotland was founded in 1780 and had the management of a large national antiquarian museum in Edinburgh.
The Society of Antiquaries of Newcastle upon Tyne, the oldest provincial antiquarian society in England, was founded in 1813.
In Ireland a society was founded in 1849 called the Kilkenny Archaeological Society, holding its meetings at Kilkenny. In 1869 its name was changed to the Royal Historical and Archaeological Association of Ireland, and in 1890 to the Royal Society of Antiquaries of Ireland, its office being transferred to Dublin.
The American Antiquarian Society was founded in 1812, with its headquarters at Worcester, Massachusetts. In modern times, its library has grown to over 4 million items, and as an institution it is internationally recognized as a repository and research library for early (pre-1876) American printed materials.

In addition, a number of local historical and archaeological societies have adopted the word "antiquarian" in their titles. These have included the Cambridge Antiquarian Society, founded in 1840; the Lancashire and Cheshire Antiquarian Society, founded in 1883; the Clifton Antiquarian Club, founded in Bristol in 1884; the Orkney Antiquarian Society, founded in 1922; and the Plymouth Antiquarian Society, founded in Plymouth, Massachusetts in 1919.

Notable antiquarians

Patrick Abercromby
Arthur Agarde
Pasquale Amati
Giovanni Anastasi
Elias Ashmole
John Aubrey
Abd-al Latif al-Baghdadi
Sir James Balfour
Thomas Baker
John Bale
Daines Barrington
Thomas Bateman
John Battely
Flavio Biondo
William Borlase
William Bragge
Thomas Browne
George Buck
William Camden
Robert Bruce Cotton
Robert Crowley
Abraham de la Pryme
Catherine Downes
Sir William Dugdale
Rev. Dr. Henry Duncan

John Foxe
Richard Grafton
Ibn Abd-el-Hakem
Anthony Charles Harris
Robert Stephen Hawker
Sir Richard Colt Hoare
Muhammad al-Idrisi
Montague Rhodes James
Maurice Johnson
Nasir Khusraw
Al-Kindi
Alexander Crawford Lamb
William Lambarde
John Leland
Edward Lhuyd
H. P. Lovecraft
William Collings Lukis
Thomas Edward Lawrence
Herman H. J. Lynge
Daniel Lysons
Samuel Lysons
Dubhaltach MacFhirbhisigh
Al-Maqrizi

Philip Norman
Peregrine O'Duignan
Ruaidhri O Flaithbheartaigh
Elias Owen
Nicolas-Claude Fabri de Peiresc
Dorning Rasbotham
Franklin Pierce Rice
Fred Rosenstock
Joaquín Rubio y Muñoz
Shen Kuo 
William Forbes Skene
Jacques Seligmann
George Dudley Seymour
Sir Hans Sloane
John Stow
William Stukeley
Ralph Thoresby
Robert Thoroton
George Vertue
Ibn Wahshiyya
Horace Walpole
Olaus Wormius
Thomas Wright

See also
Historian
Collector
Connoisseur
Epigraphy
Sigillography
Nomenclature
Typology (archaeology)
Renaissance humanism
English county histories
Auxiliary sciences of history
The Antiquary by Sir Walter Scott

References

Bibliography

 
Pejorative terms for people
Historiography
Archaeological sub-disciplines

fr:Société des antiquaires